Greatest Hits So Far... is a compilation album by American country music group Zac Brown Band. It was released on November 10, 2014, via Atlantic Records and Southern Ground. The album includes the band's first fourteen singles from "Chicken Fried" in 2008 to "Sweet Annie" in 2013.

Commercial performance
The album debuted on Billboard 200 at No. 20 and on the Top Country Albums chart at No. 5, with 20,000 sold for the week. The album has sold 347,000 copies in pure album sales the US as of April 2017, and 3,335,000 units including tracks and streams as of March 2020.

Track listing

Charts

Weekly charts

Year-end charts

References

2014 greatest hits albums
Zac Brown Band albums
Atlantic Records compilation albums
Albums produced by Keith Stegall